Periaptodes paratestator is a species of beetle in the family Cerambycidae. It is known from Stephan von Breuning in 1980.

References

Lamiini
Beetles described in 1980